Sanhe is a township of Xuanhan County in northeastern Sichuan province, China, located about  east of the county seat. , it has one residential community and six villages under its administration.

See also 
 List of township-level divisions of Sichuan

References 

Township-level divisions of Sichuan
Xuanhan County